Beant Singh (6 January 195931 October 1984), was a bodyguard of the Prime Minister of India, Indira Gandhi, and was one of two, along with Satwant Singh, who took part in her assassination in 1984.

Family

Beant Singh was born in a Ramdasia Sikh family of Chamar tribe to Baba Sucha Singh and Kartar Kaur.

Singh's widow Bimal Kaur Khalsa initially joined the Sikh militant group, and then got imprisoned. Later she was elected from Ropar Constituency. His father, Baba Sucha Singh, was also an elected member of the Lok Sabha from Bathinda (Lok Sabha constituency).

Their son, Sarbjit Singh is a leader of SAD (Mann).

In 2003, a Bhog ceremony was held at the highest Sikh temporal seat in Akal Takht, located in the Golden Temple Complex in Amritsar, where tributes were paid.

In 2004, his death anniversary was again observed at Akal Takht, Amritsar, where his mother was honored by the head priest and tributes were paid to Satwant Singh and Kehar Singh by various political parties.

On 6 January 2008, the Akal Takht declared Beant Singh and Satwant Singh 'martyrs of Sikhism',

The Sikhism-centric political party in India, Shiromani Akali Dal, observed the death anniversary of Beant Singh and Satwant Singh as 'martyrdom' for the first time on 31 October 2008; every 31 October since, their 'martyrdom day' has been observed at Sri Akal Takht Sahib.

References

1984 deaths
Indian Sikhs
People from Rupnagar
Deaths by firearm in India
People shot dead by law enforcement officers in India
1959 births
Punjabi people
Assassination of Indira Gandhi
1984 murders in India
Prisoners who died in Indian detention
Assassins of heads of government
Indian people imprisoned on charges of terrorism
Indian people who died in prison custody